The Xinxiu bencao, also known as the Tang bencao, is a Chinese pharmacopoeia written in the Tang dynasty by a team of officials and physicians headed by editor-in-chief Su Jing. It borrowed heavily from—and expanded upon—an earlier monograph by Tao Hongjing. The text was first published in 659; although it is now considered lost in China, at least one copy exists in Japan, where the text had been transmitted to in 721.

Contents
Comprising fifty-three or fifty-four juan or "chapters", the text ostensibly contained both tujing or "illustrated descriptions" and yaotu or "drug pictures", although these illustrations are no longer extant. In total, some 850 drugs are listed in the text, including thirty foreign ingredients that were imported into China via the Silk Road, such as benzoin, oak galls, and peppercorn.

Publication history
The idea of a bencao (pharmacopoeia) that would copy and expand on Tao Hongjing's  was first mooted in 657 by court counsellor , who went by the alias "Su Gong" because of an "imperial taboo". The project was eventually approved by Emperor Gaozong, following which a team of some twenty-two officials and physicians, including the high-ranking historiographer Xu Jingzong, was assembled to complete the text. 

According to the Tang Huiyao, the Xinxiu bencao was completed "on the 17th day of the first lunar month of
the fourth year" of the Xianqing era (656–661). The text was first published in 659, making it the first state-sponsored pharmacopoeia in China, as well as one of the earliest known illustrated pharmaceutical texts. 

The Xinxiu bencao was one of the most comprehensive works of its time. It was designated by the Tang government as the "official standard with regard to drug usage", although it is unclear how widespread its readership was, given the lack of a printing press then. By the Song dynasty, the text had become lost in China, although at least one copy still exists in Japan, where it had been transmitted to in 721, and fully translated into Japanese as Honzō wamyō in 1918 by palace doctor Fukane no Sukehito. In the modern era, fragments of the Xinxiu bencao have also been discovered from a book depository in a cave in Dunhuang, Gansu.

Notes

References

Citations

Bibliography

 
 
 
 
 
 
 
 
 
 
 
 

Chinese medical texts
7th-century books